Josef Klíma (3 June 1911 – 16 February 2007) was a Czech basketball player. He competed in the men's tournament at the 1936 Summer Olympics.

References

External links
 

1911 births
2007 deaths
Czech men's basketball players
Olympic basketball players of Czechoslovakia
Basketball players at the 1936 Summer Olympics
Sportspeople from Karlovy Vary